Haldor Larsen Børve (19 August 1857 – 11 August 1933) was an architect from Ullensvang in Hordaland, Norway.  Børve started an architectural practice in Porsgrunn in 1889 and designed numerous buildings in Telemark and Vestfold, many of them influenced by Dragestil and the Nordic National Romantic style.  Among his best-known works are Dalen Hotel from 1894 and Porsgrunn City Hall from 1904/1905.

Background
Børve was born in Ullensvang in 1857 to farmer Lars Jørgensen Børve (1815–91) and Anna Haldorsdatter Eidnes (1822–1911).  He attended Trondheim Technical Vocational School from 1877 to 1880, after which he worked for a few years as a junior architect.  His only major project during this time was managing the restoration of Ullensvang Church in Ullensvang from 1883 to 1886, a project led by Bergen architect Christian Christie.  In 1887, he pursued further education at the Polytechnic Institute of Hannover in Germany.  He was among the last of the great Norwegian architects to attend the architectural school in Hannover, which had greatly influenced Norwegian architecture in the latter half of the 19th century.  He finished his studies in 1889, and with the help of a government grant for engineers, he moved to Porsgrunn in Telemark, Norway and started his own architectural firm that same year. In 1890, he  married Kristine Jørstad (1861–1941).

Career

Haldor Larsen Børve's first work under the new firm was the Borgestad school (Borgestad skole) built in Skien in 1889.  The building was bestowed upon the local school district by local shipping magnate and future prime minister Gunnar Knudsen.  Though the building has long since been demolished, it was once a grand three-story stone building in the Neo-Gothic style, a symmetrical design with steep gables on both ends which featured Gothic window designs and pointed arches.

While Børve had learned a great deal about contemporary German architecture during his studies in Hannover, as shown in his use of Neo-Gothic and Swiss chalet styles.  He was also a great proponent of Norwegian romantic nationalism and often integrated elements from Dragestil and National Romantic style into his work, as exemplified by Dalen Hotel, Børve's best-known work.  In addition to his architectural practice, Børve was also the head teacher and later administrator at Porsgrunn Technical Evening School.  He was active as an architect until the early 1920s, and died in 1933 at Porsgrunn, aged 75.

Following Børve's death, his daughter, architect Alfhild Børve, took over her father's practice along with Haldor Larsen Børve's assistant Ødegaard.  The next year, Johannes Laurentius Borchsenius (1903-2003) took over as co-owner with Alfhild Børve, and the firm changed its name to Børve Borchsenius Arkitekter.  Borchsenius was an architect from Skien who studied at the Norwegian Institute of Technology.  He was responsible for the construction of camps for Norwegian refugees in Sweden during World War II and, following the war, the reconstruction of areas in Finnmark such as Vadsø and Kirkenes.  The newly named firm designed several buildings in the Porsgrunn area using functionalist principles, including the Folkets hus just across from Børve's Vår Frue Church.  The company still exists today under the same name, making it one of the longest-running architectural firms in Norway.

Major works

Croftholmen
With the exception of Gunnar Knudsen's Borgestad School in 1889, the mansion on Croftholmen (now Croftholmen High School) in Stathelle was Børve's first major work under his new firm.  The work was commissioned by Frederic Croft in 1890.  Croft was a very wealthy Englishman whose father, William Croft, was a mine owner in Yorkshire who also had a high position in "The Norway Mining Timber Company" in Hull.  Frederic Croft had trained in England as an engineer, but in 1870 he took one of his father's boats and sailed away to Norway, reportedly to forget a painful love story from back home.  Croft also had a reputation of being a very eccentric figure.  He was among the first people to own an automobile in the county, and one story involved him being ticketed for scaring the horses while driving through Porsgrunn.  The policeman issued him a fine of twenty kroner, and Croft handed him forty kroner instead.  When told again that the fine was only twenty kroner, Croft replied, "But I will also return home."

After considering several properties on which to build his estate, including on the island of Bjørkøya in Langesundfjord, Croft settled on the island Gjermundsholmen in Stathelle, for which he paid 10,000 kroner.  Before Croft bought the island, Gjermundsholmen was densely forested and a popular location for vagrants, and it allegedly received its name from a man who was killed by vagrants there.  Croft commissioned Børve to build the main house on the island in 1890.  While digging the building's foundation, the workers found a human skeleton that they estimated could have been there for ten or fifteen years.  The construction was led by master builder Sigurdsen from Skien and it took 25 builders until 1895 to complete.   Since 1957 the building has been used as a school, first as a navigational school for sailors and now as a high school.

The building has a distinctive Dragestil architectural style and is painted dark red, originally with a high-quality paint imported from England. It exhibits many features of the style, including eaves adorned with dragon heads and a roof with several decorative spires. When Croft lived there the home was lavishly furnished, and some of the pieces of furniture can now be found on display at the Porsgrunn City Museum. The living room was furnished in the rococo style, while the smoking room had heavy brown leather chairs and the hall included some pieces of antique Elizabethan furniture.

Customs House

Dalen Hotel

Vår Frue Church

Skotfoss Church

The initiative to build a church in Skotfoss was taken by Gustav Fangel Smidt, who managed the nearby Skotfoss Bruk paper mill.  At the time, the townspeople of Skotfoss and Dalsbygda had to travel many miles west along the banks of Norsjø to Melum Church (Melum kirke) in order to attend mass.  The founders of Union Co. (later the Norske Skog Union), who owned Skotfoss Bruk, agreed to donate 1,000 kroner each towards the construction of the new church, and the remaining 38,000 of the 42,000 kroner cost was split between wholesaler Thor Eger and Rittmester Heftye.  The church's site, located on Sandåsen near the entrance to Løveid Canal, was donated by the board of directors of the Norsjø–Skien Canal.  Haldor Børve designed the building, and planning and joinery work was completed by workers from Skotfoss Bruk.

Porsgrunn City Hall

Timeline of works

Churches
 1883–6: Restoration of Ullensvang Church, Ullensvang
 1891: Langangen Church, Langangen
 1899: Vår Frue Church, Porsgrunn
 1899–1900: Skotfoss Church, Skotfoss
 1905: Herre Church, Bamble
 1906–7: Immanuel Church, Christopher Hvidts plass 6, Sandefjord
 1915: Strandlykkja Chapel, Stange
 1915: Kviteseid Church, Kviteseid
 1916: Fjågesund Church, Fjågesund
 1916–18: Sandefjord Methodist Church, Sandefjord

Businesses and public buildings
 1889: Borgestad School, Skien
 1891: Customs House, Porsgrunn
 1891–92: Fredensborg Woman's Home, Porsgrunn
 1893: Meat inspection building, Sandefjord
 1894: Dalen Hotel, Dalen
 1895: Porsgrunn Swimming Hall, Porsgrunn
 1897: Gjerpen dairy, Gjerpen
 1899–1900: Sandefjord Middle School, Sandefjord
 1899–1901: Porsgrunn Dairy Company, Porsgrunn
 1900–1901: Porsgrunn Fire Station & Power Station, Porsgrunn
 1903–8: Sandefjord Retirement Home, Bjerggaten 38, Sandefjord
 1904–5: Porsgrunn City Hall, Porsgunn
 1905–6: Hans Cappelens Minne Orphanage, Skien
 1904: Dyrings Bookstore at Storgaten 154, Porsgrunn
 1907–9: Bratsberg County Hospital, Skien
 1908–12: Sandefjord Aktie-Kreditbanken Bank, Rådhusgaten 11, Sandefjord
 1911: Porsgrunn Lutheran Hospital, Porsgrunn
 1912: Årlifoss Power Plant, Notodden
 1915: Hardanger Folk High School, Ullensvang
 1915-20: County Hospital for Aust-Agder, Arendal
 1918: Haukerød School, Sandefjord
 1922: Holt Agricultural School, Tvedestrand
 1923: Foldsæ Agricultural School, Fyresdal

Residences
 1890–1895: Croftholmen mansion, Stathelle
 1891: Børve's personal villa, Aallsgate 13, Porsgrunn
 1891: Aallsgate 15, Porsgrunn
 1891: Farmhouse on Helleland farm, Ullensvang
 1894: Hjertnespromenaden 3, Sandefjord
 1896: Holengården villa, Jernbanegaten 6, Porsgrunn
 1906: J.C. Knudsen's villa at Øvre Frednes, Porsgrunn

References

1857 births
1933 deaths
People from Hordaland
Norwegian architects
Art Nouveau architects
People from Ullensvang
People from Telemark